The Agrock yard is a Rail yard in rural Central Florida near a defunct phosphate mine and what is now the resultant ghost town in Brewster, Florida, now under the jurisdiction of Fort Meade, Florida— some 6 to 8 miles due west of the yard.

Rail yards in Florida
Buildings and structures in Polk County, Florida